The 34th World Sprint Speed Skating Championships took place in Calgary, Canada (Olympic Oval) on the 18th the 19th of January, 2003.

Competition 
 66 athletes from 14 countries took part in multiple events

Women

Final standings 
Table shows the 12 highest finishing athletes at the Championships

1st Race - 500m

1st Race - 1,000m

2nd Race -  500m

2nd Race -  1,000m

Men

Final standings 
Shows the top 12 male athletes at the Championships

 JWR = Junior World Record

1st Race - 500m

1st Race - 1,000m

2nd Race - 500m

2nd Race - 1,000m 

 JWR = Junior World Record

External links 
 Results List (in German)

World Speed Skating Championships
World Championships
International speed skating competitions hosted by Canada
Sport in Calgary
World Sprint Speed Skating Championships
World Sprint Speed Skating Championships
World Sprint Speed Skating Championships